Cedar Hill, also known as Long Farm, is a historic home located at Westover, Somerset County, Maryland, United States. It is a -story T-shaped frame dwelling, on a brick foundation. The main section was erected in 1793, and followed a modified hall / parlor plan.  Also on the property are an 1880 bi-level hay-and-horse barn with a long shed addition for dairy stalls, a 19th-century granary, a late-19th-century corn crib, a rusticated concrete block well house, and a rusticated concrete dairy.

Cedar Hill was listed on the National Register of Historic Places in 1991.

References

External links
, including photo from 1990, at Maryland Historical Trust

Hall and parlor houses
Houses in Somerset County, Maryland
Houses on the National Register of Historic Places in Maryland
Federal architecture in Maryland
Greek Revival houses in Maryland
Victorian architecture in Maryland
Houses completed in 1793
National Register of Historic Places in Somerset County, Maryland